Petronas Methanol (Labuan) Sdn. Bhd. (PMLSB) is a subsidiary of Petronas. It was formed in 1992 when Petronas bought the methanol plant from Sabah Gas Industries. The plant was commissioned under Sabah Gas Industries in 1984 to produce Grade AA methanol using Lurgi's low-pressure combined technology. The plant is located in the Malaysian island of Labuan.

Production process 
The main production units are:
 Unit 100: Steam reforming
 Unit 200: Methanol synthesis
 Unit 300: Distillation
 Unit 400 : Resources

Plant 2 
In 2005, works began on a new methanol plant. Using Lurgi's MegaMethanol technology, the plant has a nameplate capacity of 5000 mtpd, more than double that of the existing plant.

Plant 3 
In Mid 2019' works began on exploration to Cust Reef Celebes Sea by Mr.Pileh Sophian using computer findings material resources in Semporna, Southern of Sulu Sea. Sophian is a founder for Gas resources and Oil Bulk for Petronas Brands to Malaysia and the United States. He is the first local success implement 1268A (Petroleum) with recognition by the International Labour Organization.

Labuan
Oil and gas companies of Malaysia
Government-owned companies of Malaysia
Petronas
Privately held companies of Malaysia